Grade One is a Chinese variety show produced by Hunan Broadcasting System. The reality show adopts a parent-child style of interaction was shot at "Xiangjun Future Experimental School". In the show, Chen Xuedong served as homeroom teacher while Xiao Song Jia served as a teacher. It was first aired on October 17, 2014, and was broadcast on every Friday.

Summary 
The theme decided by the production team was the "growth diary of a fresh newbie teacher". There were 7 elementary school students who participated the show, each from different family background. These seven students were on their day of elementary school, with previously transited from their respective pre-schools. Without their friends and parents, these students with only the two newbie teachers will have to independently spend the rest of the semester in the dormitory.

Production 
According to media reports, Hunan TV invested more than 100 million yuan of funds, but 80% of the funds are used in the equipment and post-editing. Cost for the cast were less than what netizens and the outside world expected.

Shooting of the program was conducted in a fully enclosed campus, and the producers installed 120 cameras in the filming area and 15 movie cameras. The scale of filming was far greater than that of "I Am a Singer" and "Where Are We Going? Dad" and other reality shows.

The reality show shared the same director and creator with "Super Girl" and "Super Boys", Xia Qing, the same producer with "X-Change", Xu Qing, and the same production team with "Divas Hit the Road".

Ratings

Hunan Broadcasting System 

|-
| 1 || 2014-10-17 || 1.06 || 4.57 || 3 || align="center" | First broadcast ofThe Amazing Race China (SZMG)
|-
| 2 || 2014-10-24 || 1.110 || 5.11 || 4 || align="center" | First broadcast ofKeep Running (ZJTV)
|-
| 3 || 2014-10-31 || 1.122 || 5.12 || 4 || align="center" |
|-
| 4 || 2014-11-7 || 1.028 || 4.81 || 4 || align="center" |
|-
| 5 || 2014-11-14 || 1.059 || 4.70 || 5 || align="center" |
|-
| 6 || 2014-11-21 || style="color:red" | 1.227 || 5.71 || 5 || align="center" |
|-
| 7 || 2014-11-28 || style="color:blue" | 0.953 || style="color:blue" | 4.43 || 6 || align="center" | First broadcast ofMillion Fans(百万粉丝) (TJTV) broadcast
|-
| 8 || 2014-12-5 || 1.164 || 5.79 || 4 || align="center" |
|-
| 9 || 2014-12-12 || 1.029 || 4.85 || 5 || align="center" |
|-
| 10 || 2014-12-19 || 1.089 || 5.33 || 5 || align="center" | Finale ofThe Amazing Race China             (SZMG)
|-
| 11 || 2014-12-26 || 1.220 || style="color:red" | 5.85 || 4 || align="center" | Finale ofShe's My Family (Jiangsu Television)

List of episodes

References

External links
 
 http://www.hunantv.com/v/1/56649/

Chinese variety television shows
2014 Chinese television series debuts